Taehwagang station, meaning Taehwa River station, is a train station located in Samsan-dong, Nam-gu, Ulsan. It was previously named Ulsan station until the KTX Ulsan station opened on November 1, 2010.

History 
October 25, 1921: Service opened at Seongnam-dong, Jung-gu
December 1, 1935: Service moved to former Hakseong-ri, Ulsan-gun with standard gauge
April 26, 1953: Promotion in status to level 5 station
September 10, 1971: Designated as civilian coal arrival processing station
August 21, 1979: Cancellation of designation as civilian coal arrival processing station (However, processing occurred provisionally until October 15, 1979)
1987: Announcement of relocation of Ulsan City Rail
October 22, 1989: Started Seoul–Ulsan Saemaeul-ho
August 20, 1992: Service moved to 8-8 Samsan-dong, Nam-gu, the current place
October 15, 2002: Raised the number of Saemaeul Express for Seoul–Ulsan
June 1, 2007: Seoul–Ulsan Saemaul line extended to Seoul–Bujeon
November 1, 2010: Renamed to Taehwagang Station due to the station on Gyeongbu HSR, and reduced Seoul–Bujeon Saemaeul line to Dongdaegu–Bujeon

External links

 Cyber station information from Korail

Railway stations in Ulsan
Nam District, Ulsan
Railway stations opened in 1921